The Birmingham Public Library is of the largest library systems in the southeastern United States. It consists of 19 branches and a main or central library located in downtown Birmingham, Alabama. The main library is composed of two buildings, the East Building and the Linn-Henley Research Library containing the Tutwiler Collection of Southern History, and the Rucker Agee Map Collection.

History 
As an adjunct of Birmingham's public schools, the Birmingham Public Library was established in 1886. John H. Phillips, then superintendent of the public school system, set up a library in a room not much bigger than a closet. In 1913, a public library board was established, and the City of Birmingham assumed responsibility for funding the growing institution.

In 1918, a branch specifically for the use of African-American residents opened, named after Booker T. Washington. The Booker T. Washington branch was headed by Mattie Herd Roland, and was the first African-American librarian in Alabama.

The library was later moved to City Hall, where the collection burned in a fire in 1925. An impressive Neo-classical building of Indiana limestone was completed in 1927, serving as the central facility of the Birmingham Public Library for 57 years. The city's library system was desegregated in April 1963, in part because of a lawsuit filed by the Alabama Christian Movement for Human Rights on behalf of Joe and Lola Hendricks.

To accommodate the growing collection and demand for services, an additional structure containing  of floor space was completed in 1984 and connected to the original building via a crosswalk. This building houses most of the Central Library's circulating and general reference collections, plus the technical services for the library system.

The original 1927 building was renovated in 1985 and renamed the Linn-Henley Research Library. This facility houses the library's special collections, and government publications. Together, these two buildings comprise the Central Library of the Birmingham Public Library system.

In addition to the Central Library, the Birmingham Public Library system includes 17 branches located elsewhere in the city. This branch system was begun when the Birmingham library began to integrate libraries from independent communities that gradually became incorporated into Birmingham. In the 1980s, the library board had adopted plans to build regional libraries that would serve large sections of the city, would have larger collections and facilities, and would be opened more hours.

Annual circulation of roughly 1.7 million checkouts is matched by an equal number of materials being used within the libraries and via electronic access. Birmingham Public Library accounts for 46% of the circulation in the Jefferson County Library Cooperative, which posts a combined circulation of almost 3.7 million items checked out annually. The cooperative agreement that Birmingham Public Library shares with the other municipal public libraries of Jefferson County, Alabama greatly increases the number of library materials available to all library members. In fact, the Jefferson County Library Cooperative is a model for how separate governments can work together to provide a public service across city boundaries.

Floyd Council was named the first male African-American director of the Birmingham Public Library system in 2017. Council's tenure was marked by internal conflict. Library employees suffered from "low morale," and allegations of a "toxic" work environment followed Council. Council was suspended without pay for a month in October 2020 for undisclosed reasons. He resigned shortly after in December 2020.

The COVID-19 pandemic caused major service disruptions. All branches temporarily closed in March 2020 before reopening with a focus on virtual programming and curbside services. A budget cut of nearly two million dollars due to the pandemic caused the system to furlough 158 of its 211 employees in September 2020. The Eastwood Branch Library was also permanently closed, the first branch to close since 2010. Many of the furloughed employees returned in December 2020 when curbside service was expanded to all neighborhood branches.

Major collections and services 

Tutwiler Collection of Southern History and Literature is a collection that covers Southern life and culture. There are extensive newspaper clipping files on local and regional history that can be searched for information along with periodicals and online databases. Other collections of note included are the Caribbean Collection, the Rucker Agee Map Collection, and the Rare Book Collection of early Americana.

In 2006, Digital Collections was initiated to preserve and make available the local history of Birmingham and the surrounding area.

Virtual Library Services include online databases, eBooks and downloadable audio books, Ask A Librarian, blogs and RSS feeds and other Internet resources.

Public Computing Services include public access computers at all locations and free wireless access to the Internet via Wi-Fi available at the Central Library, Avondale Branch, Five Points West Branch, North Birmingham Branch, Springville Road Branch and West End Branch.

Library events 

Alabama Bound is an annual book and author fair that celebrates Alabama authors and publishers. Hosted by the Birmingham Public Library, it is an event where fans may meet authors, buy their books and hear them read from and talk about their work. Book signings follow each presentation.

Branches
The Birmingham Public Library operates 18 branches throughout many of Birmingham's neighborhoods. In addition to the Central Branch in Downtown, four larger branches are operate as regional branches.

Former branches

References

External links 
 Official website
 Bhamwiki article on the Linn-Henley Research Library
  Alabama Bound

Education in Jefferson County, Alabama
Public libraries in Alabama
Education in Birmingham, Alabama
Buildings and structures in Birmingham, Alabama